Elizabeth Shaila "Liza" Koshy (born March 31, 1996), is an American media personality and actress. Her main YouTube channel has amassed more than 17 million subscribers, and her two channels have a combined total of over 3 billion views. She has received four Streamy Awards, four Teen Choice Awards, and a Kids' Choice Award.

Koshy began her career on Vine in 2013, before starting a YouTube channel. She made her acting debut as Aday Walker in Tyler Perry's horror comedy film Boo! A Madea Halloween (2016), and went on to play The Explorer in the YouTube Premium series Escape the Night (2017) and Violet Adams in the Hulu drama television series Freakish (2016–2017). She was a contributor to the MTV television series Total Request Live (2017–2018). 

Koshy produced and starred as the title character in the YouTube Premium comedy series Liza on Demand (2018–2021), which earned her several accolades, and hosted the Nickelodeon game show revival Double Dare (2018–2019) for which she received a Daytime Emmy Award nomination. She starred in the Netflix dance-comedy film Work It (2020).

Koshy was included in the 2019 Forbes 30 Under 30 Hollywood & Entertainment list and the Time 2019 list of the 25 Most Influential People on the Internet and its 2019 100 Next list.

Early life
Elizabeth Shaila Koshy was born in Houston, Texas, on March 31, 1996, the daughter of Jean Carol (née Hertzler), an American yoga instructor of German descent, and Jose Koshy, an Indian Malayali petroleum executive from Kerala. She has two older sisters. From kindergarten until fifth grade, she was placed in a dual language educational and cultural program, where she learned to speak Spanish. In 2014, after attending Lamar High School, Koshy enrolled in the University of Houston and began to study business marketing. In 2015, she left college and moved to Los Angeles to pursue a media career.

Career

Social media

Koshy began posting comic videos on the Vine platform, in 2013, under the pseudonym "Lizzza", where she posted short comedic videos. When Vine closed in 2017, Koshy had 7 million followers. By 2016, Koshy was also becoming noted on the YouTube platform. In November 2016, just before the 2016 election, Koshy interviewed President Barack Obama on her YouTube channel to encourage voter registration. Koshy's videos feature "her loud facial expressions, quick pace, and her commitment to looking as ridiculous as possible as the joke demands. [Some of her videos] take serious issues – like anxiety, the pressure to fit in, and internet trolls – and make them accessible and engaging for her viewers." She suspended adding new videos to her main YouTube account in early 2018 as she turned to full-time acting and hosting work. She resumed posting new videos in 2019.

In 2017, Koshy became "the fastest YouTube personality to reach 10 million subscribers". As of 2021, her main YouTube channel had over 17 million subscribers and more than 2 billion views. Her second YouTube channel had more than 8 million subscribers, and her two channels had a combined total of more than 3 billion views. She had more than 18 million followers on Instagram, more than 26 million followers on TikTok more than 4 million on Facebook and more than 2.8 million on Twitter. Time named Koshy to its 2019 list of the 25 Most Influential People on the Internet and its 2019 100 Next list.

Acting
In 2016, Koshy starred in the Hulu original horror series Freakish as Violet Adams. She reprised the role in the show's second season in 2017. Also in 2016, she played the role of Aday Walker in the horror-comedy feature film, Boo! A Madea Halloween, and starred as herself in the YouTube Premium series, Jingle Ballin. Koshy starred as Princess Aubrey in the 2016 comedy film FML. In 2017, she played a recurring character, The Explorer, in the YouTube Premium mystery-reality series Escape the Night.

Koshy stars in and co-produces a YouTube Premium situation comedy series, Liza on Demand, which premiered in June 2018, "following the chaotic misadventures of the eponymous character" as she works to become an "elite tasker" doing odd jobs for pay. A reviewer for the Los Angeles Times wrote: "The first episode ... is not bad. Yet it's also ordinary and a little stiff. … But the second ... is better ... and shows off Koshy to good effect, some effective physical comedy included. It made me laugh, anyway." Season 2 premiered in September 2019. Alexis Gunderson of Paste wrote in 2019: "Liza on Demand a truly excellent comedy." In November 2018, Koshy voiced the character Owl in Crow: The Legend, an animated virtual-reality short film written and directed by Eric Darnell, starring John Legend. The film premiered on the Liza Koshy Too YouTube channel and Oculus VR on November 15, 2018. She returned to Escape the Night in 2019. She co-starred in the Netflix dance-comedy film Work It (2020). A review in The New York Times stated: "Both Koshy and [Jordan] Fisher are accomplished professional dancers, and the movie doesn't skimp on showcasing their gifts." Koshy voiced Zipp Storm in the 2021 Netflix film My Little Pony: A New Generation.

Other ventures
Koshy hosted the live preshow at the 2017 Golden Globes Awards, which received 2.7 million live viewers on Twitter – a record for the medium. She also hosted Nigel Lythgoe's series Every Single Step and was "the only social entertainer chosen to promote the 2016 MTV Movie Awards." She was one of the hosts on Total Request Live on MTV from 2017 to 2018 and served as a producer and developer of content for MTV. Koshy was the first "digital star" interviewed for Vogue magazine's "73 Questions" web series. Koshy conducted interviews of the celebrities attending the 2018 and 2019 Met Galas on behalf of Vogue. She hosted the revival of the Nickelodeon game show Double Dare from June 2018 to December 2019. In 2020, Koshy hosted the Quibi dance competition show Floored.

Her online advertisements for Beats Electronics draw four times more viewers than those of other celebrities. Koshy collaborates with The Giving Keys, a jewelry company that employs and supports the formerly homeless population, on a necklace collection. She is a co-chair of "When We All Vote", a nonpartisan, nonprofit group dedicated to increasing voter participation. She also advertises Beyond Meat.

Personal life
Koshy dated Slovak media personality David Dobrik from late 2015 to early 2018.

Filmography

Film

Television

Music videos

Reception
Teen Vogue named Koshy to its 2016 list of "The 7 Female Comedians You Need to Know". The Hollywood Reporter included Koshy in its 2017 list of "15 Rising Crossover Stars". The Washington Post cited Koshy as one of the "funny women...at the top of their game today [who] girls get to study" as models for comedy and empowerment. She is a member of the 2019 Forbes 30 Under 30 Hollywood & Entertainment list.

John Jurgensen of The Wall Street Journal described Koshy's appeal as follows: "Her comedy is heavy on self-deprecation, slapstick and wordplay, more goofy than snarky. ... One reason her sketches work for advertisers is the replay factor, [squeezing] in dozens of puns and double meanings, in part to encourage easily distracted viewers to re-watch. ... Koshy has proven to be safe territory for established entertainment companies and advertisers who have fled from edgier online content". Alexis Gunderson of Paste compared Koshy to Lucille Ball and calls her a "physical comedy wunderkind" and "a tiny magnetic goofball".

Awards and nominations 
Koshy has won four Streamy Awards and Teen Choice Awards, and a Kids' Choice Award.

References

External links

Trailer for Liza on Demand (2018)

1996 births
21st-century American actresses
Actresses from Houston
American actresses of Indian descent
American people of Malayali descent
American game show hosts
American television actresses
American TikTokers
American web series actresses
American YouTubers
Comedy YouTubers
Living people
Streamy Award winners
University of Houston alumni
American people of German descent
YouTube vloggers
Entertainment-related YouTube channels